Nikhil Kanetkar (born 13 May 1979) is the only Olympic badminton player from Pune India.

Born in a Maharashtrian family, Kanetkar played badminton at the 2004 Summer Olympics in men's singles, defeating Sergio Llopis of Spain in the first round. In the round of 16, Kanetkar was defeated by Peter Gade of Denmark. In addition to Olympics, Kanetkar has represented India in the Thomas Cup, All England Open, Asian Games, World Championships, Commonwealth Games, SAF Games, Swiss Open, French Open, Toulouse Open and numerous other championships.

In 2011, he retired from competitive sports and set up Nikhil Kanetkar Badminton Academy (NKBA, www.nkba.in) in Pune, India. The academy is based at  Shree Shiv Chhatrapati Sports Complex, Mahalunge-Balewadi, Pune, India. NKBA was established with a vision of "Grooming Talent to Make Champions". Nikhil Kanetkar is currently the Director and Head Coach of NKBA.

Kanetkar is also a columnist and commentator. He wrote for the Marathi newspaper Sakal from Athens during the Olympics and subsequently was invited by StarSports for covering the Badminton events of the 2016 Rio Olympics.

Kanetkar played after 7 years post retirement and won the Men's Singles Title in the 35+ age category in the 41st Indian Masters (Veterans) National Badminton Championships 2016–17 organised by Kerala Badminton Association at Regional Sports Centre, Kadavanthra, Kochi, Kerala. In September 2017, he won the bronze medal in the same age group at the BWF World Senior Badminton Championship held in Kochi, India.

Achievements

BWF World Senior Championships

South Asian Games 
Men's singles

IBF World Grand Prix 
The World Badminton Grand Prix sanctioned by International Badminton Federation (IBF) since 1983.

Men's singles

IBF International 
Men's singles

Sources
Kanetkar, Saina lead D-day challenge
I choose not to be frustrated: Kanetkar
Nikhil Kanetkar loses in semis
task for shuttlers – Aparna Popat, Abhinn Shyam Gupta and Nikhil Kanetkar carry Indian hopes

References

External links
 
 Official Website

1979 births
Living people
Racket sportspeople from Pune
Marathi sportspeople
Indian male badminton players
Badminton players at the 2004 Summer Olympics
Olympic badminton players of India
Badminton players at the 1998 Commonwealth Games
Badminton players at the 2002 Commonwealth Games
Commonwealth Games silver medallists for India
Commonwealth Games medallists in badminton
Badminton players at the 2006 Asian Games
Asian Games competitors for India
South Asian Games gold medalists for India
South Asian Games silver medalists for India
South Asian Games medalists in badminton
Medallists at the 1998 Commonwealth Games